The Colorado River is an approximately  long river in the U.S. state of Texas. It is the 18th longest river in the United States and the longest river with both its source and its mouth within Texas.

Its drainage basin and some of its usually dry tributaries extend into New Mexico. It flows generally southeast from Dawson County through Ballinger, Marble Falls, Lago Vista, Austin, Bastrop, Smithville, La Grange, Columbus, Wharton, and Bay City, before emptying into the Gulf of Mexico at Matagorda Bay.

Course 

The Colorado River originates south of Lubbock, on the Llano Estacado near Lamesa. It flows generally southeast out of the Llano Estacado and through the Texas Hill Country, then through several reservoirs including Lake J.B. Thomas, E.V. Spence Reservoir, and O.H. Ivie Lake. The river flows through several more reservoirs before reaching Austin, including Lake Buchanan, Inks Lake, Lake Lyndon B. Johnson (commonly referred to as Lake LBJ), and Lake Travis. The Llano River joins the Colorado at Lake LBJ near Kingsland, and the Pedernales River joins at Lake Travis near Briarcliff. After passing through Austin, the Colorado River continues flowing southeast until emptying into Matagorda Bay on the Gulf of Mexico, near Matagorda.

History 
The Colorado River, which means 'red' or 'reddish' river in Spanish, was frequently confused by Spanish explorers with the Brazos River to the north. The two names would later be reversed.

The upper Colorado River was controlled by Comanches from the early 18th century to the late 19th century. In 1757, Spanish Texas attempted to establish an outlying Catholic mission (Mission Santa Cruz de San Sabá) on the San Saba River, near its confluence with the Colorado River. Nearly defenseless and viewed by the Comanche tribe as a territorial invasion, the mission was sacked in 1758 by about 2,000 Comanches and their allies. The Comanche were not effectively challenged on the upper Colorado River for nearly a century.

River modifications 
The river is an important source of water for farming, cities, and electrical power production. Major man-made reservoirs on the river include Lake Buchanan, Inks Lake, Lake LBJ, Lake Marble Falls, Lake Travis, Lake Austin, Town Lake now called Lady Bird Lake in Austin. Collectively, these lakes are known as the Highland Lakes. In addition to power plants operating on each of the major lakes, waters of the Colorado are used for cooling the South Texas Nuclear Project near Bay City. The Colorado River Municipal Water District owns and operates three reservoirs upstream of the Highland Lakes: Lake J. B. Thomas near Snyder, E.V. Spence Reservoir near Robert Lee, and O.H. Ivie Lake near Ballinger.

Flood control and use of the Colorado River is managed by two agencies established by the Texas Legislature: the Upper Colorado River Authority and the Lower Colorado River Authority. There are 11 major reservoirs along the Colorado River.

Major tributaries

The Colorado River is joined by five significant tributaries: the Concho River, Pecan Bayou, the Llano River, the San Saba River and the Pedernales River. Beals Creek is also a tributary fed by arroyos such as the Sulphur Springs Draw, the Johnson Draw, and the McKenzie, Seminole, Monument, Mustang, and Midland draws.

Gallery

See also 
 Colorado City, Texas
 List of crossings of the Colorado River (Texas)
 List of rivers of Texas
 List of tributaries of the Colorado River (Texas)
 Matagorda Bay—the river's mouth
 Texas Hill Country

References

External links 

Upper Colorado River Authority
Lower Colorado River Authority

 
Rivers of Texas
Drainage basins of the Gulf of Mexico
Llano Estacado
Texas Hill Country
Rivers of Dawson County, Texas
Rivers of Matagorda County, Texas
Rivers of Borden County, Texas
Rivers of Scurry County, Texas
Rivers of Mitchell County, Texas
Rivers of Coke County, Texas
Rivers of Runnels County, Texas
Rivers of Coleman County, Texas
Rivers of Concho County, Texas
Rivers of McCulloch County, Texas
Rivers of Brown County, Texas
Rivers of San Saba County, Texas
Rivers of Mills County, Texas
Rivers of Lampasas County, Texas
Rivers of Burnet County, Texas
Rivers of Travis County, Texas
Rivers of Bastrop County, Texas
Rivers of Fayette County, Texas
Rivers of Colorado County, Texas
Rivers of Wharton County, Texas